The Upper Aulaqi Sheikhdom was a state in the British Aden Protectorate, the Federation of Arab Emirates of the South, and its successor, the Federation of South Arabia. Its capital was Sa'id. The area of the former state is now central part of the Shabwah Governorate of the Republic of Yemen.

History
The Lower Aulaqi sultans separated from the Upper Aulaqi in the 18th century and the Upper Aulaqi sheikhs of Said made themselves gradually independent from the Upper Aulaqi Sultanate of Nisab during the same period.

Shaikh Farid bin Nasir died on 2 June 1883 and was succeeded by his eldest son Ruweis.

Ruweis was deposed by his tribesmen in 1890 and was succeeded by his brother Um Rasas bin Farid, who died in July 1902 and was succeeded by his brother the present Shaikh, Muhsin bin Farid.

In 1889 the Upper Aulaqi Shaikh voluntarily signed an agreement abandoning all customary rights over the Fadhli and Abdali.

On 8 December 1903 a treaty was concluded at Aden with the Upper Aulaqi Shaikh and was ratified on 5 February 1904.

In October 1918 Shaikh Yeslam Barweis, son of the late Upper Aulaqi Shaikh received a Commission in the 1st Yemen Infantry as Yuzbashi in which he remained till its disbandment in March 1925. On the raising of the Aden Protectorate Levies in April 1928 he became Senior Arab Officer and remained so until his death in September 1929.

In 1931, the population of this tribe was estimated at 30,000.

It was a founding member of the Federation of Arab Emirates of the South in 1959 and its successor, the Federation of South Arabia, in 1963.

The last sheikh, Amir Abd Allah ibn Muhsin al Yaslami Al Aulaqi, was deposed on 28 August 1967 and his state was abolished in November 1967 upon the founding of the People's Republic of South Yemen.

Rulers
The rulers of the Upper Aulaqi Sheikhdom bore the title Shaykh al-Mashyakha al-`Awlaqiyya al-`Ulya.

Sheikhs  
..... - ....                Amir Daha 
.... - ....                Amir Yaslam ibn Daha 
.... - ....                Amir `Ali ibn Yaslam 
.... - ....                Amir `Amm Dayb ibn `Ali al-Yaslami al-`Awlaqi 
.... - ....                Amir Ruways ibn `Amm Dayb al-Yaslami al-`Awlaqi 
.... - ....                Amir Nasir ibn Ruways al-Yaslami al-`Awlaqi 
1871? -  2 Jun 1883        Amir Farid ibn Nasir al-Yaslami al-`Awlaqi 
1883 - 1890                Amir Ruways ibn Farid al-Yaslami al-`Awlaqi 
1890 - Jul 1902            Amir `Amm Rassas ibn Farid al-Yaslami al-`Awlaqi 
1902 - 1959                Amir Muhsin ibn Farid al-Yaslami al-`Awlaqi 
1959 - 28 Aug 1967         Amir `Abd Allah ibn Muhsin al-Yaslami al-`Awlaqi

See also 
Upper Aulaqi Sultanate
Aden Protectorate

References

External links
Map of Arabia (1905-1923) including the states of Aden Protectorate

States in the Aden Protectorate
Federation of South Arabia
Former monarchies